Nordstromia simillima is a moth in the family Drepanidae. It was described by Frederic Moore in 1888. It is found in Kashmir in what was north-western British India.

Adults are pale brownish ochreous, both wings crossed by a similar antemedial and a postmedial line. Both these lines are of a paler tint than the ground colour of the wings. The costal spots are larger, and there is a small spot at the lower end of the cell, as well as those on the outer margin of both wings.

References

Moths described in 1888
Drepaninae